The O’Kane Building is a historic commercial building in Bend, Oregon, United States.  The structure was built in 1916 by Hugh O’Kane, a Bend businessman.  The two-story building originally housed six retail stores and a theater on the first floor with twenty offices and an apartment upstairs.  The building is located on the west corner of Oregon Avenue and Bond Street in downtown Bend.  It has been in continuous use as a commercial building since it first opened.  Today, the O’Kane Building is still the largest commercial structure in downtown Bend.  Because of its importance to the history of Bend, the O’Kane Building is listed on the National Register of Historic Places.

Hugh O'Kane 
Hugh O'Kane was born in County Antrim, Ireland in 1857.  As a young boy, he illegally immigrated to the United States by stowing away on a New York bound ship.  By the age of 12, he was selling newspapers and shining shoes on the streets of New York City.  He later learned the tailoring trade, but was always looking for adventure.  Before he settled in Bend, O’Kane worked as tailor, sailor, miner, stage coach driver, dispatch rider, horse trainer, and mule packer.

In the 1870s, he packed supplies in North Dakota and Montana for the United States Army during its campaign against the Sioux Indians.  At the time of the battle of the Little Bighorn, O'Kane was supporting General Alfred H. Terry's column, to which Lieutenant Colonel George Armstrong Custer and the 7th Cavalry were also attached.  Later, O'Kane mined gold in the Black Hills, making a $50,000 fortune; only to lose it all gambling.  From there, he moved west, packing provisions for pioneers and miners in Montana and Colorado.

In 1881, he became manager for Tom Cannon, the world champion Greco-Roman wrestler.  O’Kane led Cannon's wrestling troop on a fourteen-month tour of Europe.  He later became manager for Ed Skinner and Marley Kettleman, both world champion sprinters, taking them on a tour of Australia.  When he returned from that adventure, O’Kane married Helen A. Wright of Helena, Montana.  In 1895, O’Kane opened a large hotel in Grangeville, Idaho.  Leaving his wife to manage the hotel, O’Kane traveled around the United States racing horses, which he turned into a very successful business.

In 1903, O’Kane and his wife moved to Bend, Oregon, where they built the Bend Hotel.  Their hotel quickly became a central Oregon landmark.  It was a very popular meeting place for local businessmen and civic leaders as well as a welcome stop for travelers.  On 30 August 1915, a fire destroyed the hotel.  Undeterred by the loss of his hotel, O’Kane decided to build a commercial building on his newly vacant downtown property.  He hired the well known Beezer Brothers architectural firm to design a fireproof building with space for retail stores and offices.  His new commercial building, the O’Kane Building, was finished is 1916.  By the time his building opened, O’Kane weighed three hundred pounds so he spent most afternoons lounging in a chair propped against his building.  From there, he told colorful stories to visitors or just slept.  Late in his life O’Kane moved to Portland where he died on 16 February 1930 at the age of 73.

Building history 
The O’Kane Building was designed by Louis Beezer and Michael J. Beezer of Beezer Brothers, a Seattle based architectural firm.  The building was constructed in 1916 by Fred Frodeson, a general contractor from the Bend area.  The building originally housed six retail stores, twenty offices, and a theater.  There was also a second floor apartment used by O’Kane and his wife.  When it was built, the O’Kane Building was the largest commercial structure in Bend.  Shortly after it was opened, the O’Kane building became the first home of the Deschutes County court.  When Deschutes County separated from Crook County, Bend was selected as the county seat, but there was no courthouse so the county government rented two offices in the O’Kane Building to serve as the county court.

The O’Kane Building is an excellent example of Bend's early 20th century development.  It was the first building in Bend to be built using reinforced concrete as the primary building material and it housed the first county court.  Because of its importance to Bend history and architecture, the O’Kane Building was listed on the National Register of Historic Places on 6 November 1986.  The O’Kane Building has been in continuous use as a commercial building since it first opened in 1916.  Today, it is still the largest commercial structure in downtown Bend.

Structure 

The O’Kane Building is located on the west corner of Oregon Avenue and Bond Street in downtown Bend. The foundation is concrete and brick with stone firewalls dividing up the basement space. The building was constructed using reinforced concrete as the primary building material.
 
The building's two main façades face Oregon Avenue and Bond Street.  The façade was built with reinforced concrete.  It is painted a potter's clay beige color with white trim.  It has a flat roof with large display windows along its street frontage and large office windows above.  There are stained glass transom windows with decorative green tile borders above the building's display windows.  Each stained glass section has a “Bend” emblem incorporated in its center.  The emblem is a circular design with the word “Bend” filling the circle.  The offices on the second floor have large triple window sets.  Each window set has a large picture window in the center with one-over-one double-hung windows on either side.  Above the office windows are rectangular green tile insets with open diamond designs at each end of the rectangles.
  
The building's main entrance leads to the second floor offices.  The entrance is the buildings most decorative architectural feature.  The wooden doorframes are hand carved.  There is a stained glass transom above the entrance with a “Bend Bee” design in the middle.  The Bend Bee design is set in blue with a white border.  Above the entrance on the outside, there is a plaster cornucopia garland of flowers, fruits, and wheat stocks.

The original O’Kane theater was later converted into a billiards parlor and café.  To accommodate the new tenants, the theater section of the building was significantly altered.  There are no known photographs of the original theater, so when that section of the building was remodeled in 1985, it was designed to match the rest of the O’Kane building.  Today, the old theater houses an exercise studio.

Interior 

There is a high ceiling and simple plaster walls inside the main entrance.  A flight of steps with midway landing leads to the second floor hallway.  The second floor is an “L” shaped corridor lined with offices along the Oregon Avenue and Bond Street sides of the building.  Today, there are 19 offices along the corridor (originally there were 20 offices).  At the far end of the corridor overlooking Bond Street is an apartment suite originally built for the owner and his wife.  The corridor has plaster walls with dark wood trim.  The plaster is textured below the wainscot molding and smooth above it.  The office entrances have dark wooden door with large “pebbled glass” inset windows.  Most of the original brass and nickel hardware is still in place throughout the building.  The interiors of the first floor retail shops are open rectangular spaces without decoration as they were originally designed.

References

External links 

City of Bend, Oregon
Deschutes County, Oregon
Bend Chamber of Commerce

1916 establishments in Oregon
Commercial buildings completed in 1916
National Register of Historic Places in Bend, Oregon